Started in 2006, TwoCircles.net (informally TCN) is a non-profit online news delivering organization registered in the state of Massachusetts. It targets news about Indian Muslims, Indian politics and Muslims around the world. Its editor is Kashif-ul-Huda. TCN attracts about 10,000 unique visitors daily which includes politicians, policy planners, journalists of major newspapers and television channels. It has been quoted by The Hindu, The Sunday Guardian, and The Hindustan Times. It provides platform for young voices from the Muslim and Dalit communities to be vocal about their understanding. Their views are published in the 'YOUTH' section of the website.

Notable events
In June 2010, TCN's news editor spotted a picture he had taken of Muslim students in Azamgarh, UP, which the BJP was attempting to pass off in an ad campaign as an image of progressive Muslims in Gujarat. He alerted the mainstream media, and the BJP was roundly panned.

References

External links
 

Online nonprofit organizations
American news websites
Islamic newspapers
Internet properties established in 2006